Marian Fontowicz (13 July 1907 in Poznań – 20 November 1988) was a Polish goalkeeper. In club football, he played for Warta Poznań from 1923 to 1938.

National team career 
For the first time he was called up to the national team for the match with Sweden, played on 1 July 1928 in Katowice (2:1), he was then only a backup for Stefan Kisieliński. He played 8 international friendly matches from 1930 to 1935, where he conceded 23 goals. He conceded 5 goals two times. Fontowicz conceded 1 goal to a penalty kick in a match against Germany (lost by 2:5) on 9 September 1934.  He made his international debut on 28 September 1930 in a match against Sweden. His last international play was on 12 May 1935 against Austria. He played backup goalkeeper for the Polish Olympic team at the 1936 Summer Olympics.

Club career 
He joined the Warta Poznań football club at the age of 15. He made his debut on the first team in 1924, and made his debut in the championship on 29 March 1925 with a home match against TKS Toruń. He made his debut in the league on 3 April 1927 in a match against the Black Lions in Poznań. His final game was on 24 April 1938 in the away game against Cracovia. He has spent his entire career at Warta Poznań, playing 578 matches for the team. Warta fans called him "King of the foreground". In 1929 he won the title of Polish champion.

References

External links 
 
 Fontowicz - 11v11.com

1907 births
1988 deaths
Warta Poznań players
Polish footballers
Association football goalkeepers
Poland international footballers
Olympic footballers of Poland
Footballers at the 1936 Summer Olympics